Toamasina, meaning "like salt" or "salty", unofficially and in French Tamatave, is the capital of the Atsinanana region on the east coast of Madagascar on the Indian Ocean. In 2018 Toamasina had a population of 325,857.

History 

Under French rule, Toamasina was the seat of several foreign consuls, as well as of numerous French officials, and was the chief port for the capital and the interior. Imports consisted principally of piece-goods, farinaceous foods, and iron and steel goods; main exports were gold dust, raffia, hides, caoutchouc (natural rubber) and live animals. Communication with Europe was maintained by steamers of the Messageries Maritimes and the Havraise companies, and also with Mauritius, and thence to Sri Lanka, by the British Union-Castle Line.

During the colonial period, owing to the character of the soil and the formerly crowded native population, the town was often plagued by epidemics; the plague broke out in 1898, and again in 1900.  Since the draining of the neighboring marshes, there is some improvement, although there are still outbreaks of malaria and other diseases, as chikungunya.

Geography 
Toamasina owes its importance to the existence of a coral reef which forms a spacious harbour, entered by two openings. The city center is built on a sandy peninsula which projects at right angles from the general coastline.

South of the town there is the mouth of the Ivondro River in the Indian Ocean.

Climate
Toamasina features a trade-wind tropical rainforest climate under the Köppen climate classification. September–November is the driest period of the year, while February–April is the wettest time of the year.

Transport 

The town is the railhead for the line to the capital. Pousse-pousse (bicycle rickshaws), tuk-tuk (motorized rickshaws), and taxis are available throughout Toamasina to get around the city. Toamasina is the northern end of the Canal des Pangalanes.

The port of Toamasina serves as Madagascar's most important gateway to the Indian Ocean and to the world.

The city is served by Ambalamanasy Airport, which has limited domestic and international service. The city is the country's main seaport for international shipping.

Roads
 National Road 2 leads westwards to Antananarivo
 National Road 5 leads northwards to Maroantsetra.

Education 
The University of Toamasina was founded in 1977. There is also a Lycée Français de Tamatave, a French international school.

Hospitals
The CHU Morafeno is the university hospital of Toamasina.

Sports
The Barikadimy Stadium with a capacity 25,000 spectators. It mostly hosts football competitions and the AS Fortior.

Places of worship    
Among the places of worship, they are predominantly Christian 
churches and temples : Church of Jesus Christ in Madagascar,  Malagasy Lutheran Church, Assemblies of God, Association of Bible Baptist Churches in Madagascar, Roman Catholic Archdiocese of Toamasina (Catholic Church seated in the Cathedral of St. Joseph) and Iglesia ni Cristo. There are also Muslim mosques.

International relations

Twin towns – Sister cities
Toamasina is twinned with:
 Saint-Étienne, France
 Le Port, Réunion

See also 
 Battle of Tamatave, 1811
 Transport in Madagascar

Notes

References

External links 

 Map
 University of Toamasina 
 Regional Tourist information office - Toamasina 
 Regional Harbour of Toamasina 
 City Hall of toamasina 
 Association of the native of toamasina  

 
Cities in Madagascar
Populated places in Atsinanana
Regional capitals in Madagascar
Port cities in Africa
Ports and harbours of the Indian Ocean
Populated coastal places in Madagascar